Valérie Lemercier (born 9 March 1964) is a French actress, screenwriter, director and singer.

Life and career
Born in Dieppe, Seine-Maritime as the daughter of farmers, Lemercier grew up in Gonzeville and then studied at the Rouen Conservatoire - a dance, music and drama school. Lemercier made her screen debut in 1988, in the television series Palace.  Lemercier has won two César Awards for her supporting roles in Les Visiteurs (1993) and Fauteuils d'orchestre (2007), and  hosted the award ceremony in 2006 and 2007. She has subsequently become a successful director.

Lemercier released her first music album, Valérie Lemercier chante, in 1996, and has subsequently recorded three singles with other singers.

Filmography

As actress

As director/writer

Theatre
 Valérie Lemercier au Splendid, Théâtre du Palais-Royal (1989)
 Un fil à la patte, Théâtre du Palais-Royal (1989)
 Valérie Lemercier au Théâtre de Paris (1995–1996)
 Folies Bergère (2000)
 Valérie Lemercier au Le Palace (Paris) (2008)

Discography
 Valérie Lemercier chante (1996)
 Comme beaucoup de messieurs - duet with The Divine Comedy (band) (1996)
 J'ai un mari - duet with Pascale Borel (2006)
 Pourquoi tu t'en vas? - duet with Christophe Willem (2007)
 Peter and the Wolf (Narrator) (2007)
 Le Coup de soleil - duet with Vincent Delerm (2007)

See also
 List of female film and television directors
 List of LGBT-related films directed by women

References

External links

 

1964 births
Living people
People from Dieppe, Seine-Maritime
French film actresses
French stage actresses
French television actresses
Best Supporting Actress César Award winners
French women singers
20th-century French actresses
21st-century French actresses
French film directors
French women film directors
French women screenwriters
French screenwriters